David Roland Rodriguez (January 1, 1952 – October 26, 2015) was a folk music singer-songwriter, performer and poet.

Life and music
David Roland Rodriguez was born and raised in Houston, Texas. His paternal roots lay in Mexico, and his mother's older sister, Eva Garza, recorded for Decca Records during the 1950s. At the age of two he contracted polio and as a result Rodriguez wore a leg brace and walked with a cane for the rest of his life. Because his mobility was restricted his parents bought him a guitar. By the age of fourteen David was playing in a rock band, a year later in a folk group, and by the close of his teens was the pianist in an avant-garde ensemble.

His early musical influences included Lightnin' Hopkins, Townes Van Zandt, Lydia Mendoza, and Jerry Jeff Walker. By his early twenties, David was a law and economics graduate, based in Austin, Texas, where he spent well over the next decade playing music in Texas listening rooms, practicing law and, in 1990, running for elected public office.

In 1992, 1993 and 1994, David Rodriguez was voted the best Texas songwriter in an Austin poll by the music magazine, Third Coast Music. It has been said that Rodriguez's music inspired the work of his fellow songwriters in many ways. His song "The Ballad Of The Snow Leopard And The Tanqueray Cowboy" was recorded by country singer-songwriter Lyle Lovett for his 1998 album "Step Inside This House," and by folk artist Melissa Greener for her 2010 album "Dwelling." 

In 1994 Rodriguez decided to settle in The Netherlands where he remained until his death in 2015. On some concerts, he has been accompanied by his daughter Carrie Rodriguez on fiddle.

Political career
Rodriguez's musical aspirations underwent an eight-year hiatus that began in 1979 when he moved to Austin to pursue a profession in the legal field. In 1981, David graduated from law school at The University of Texas, Austin. As a law student he excelled academically, and his hard work earned him a coveted spot on the Texas Law Review. After graduation David was hired by McGinnis, Lochridge, and Kilgore, one of Austin's largest and most influential law firms at that time. For the next few years he worked as a criminal lawyer in Austin, while never abandoning his activist roots or his musical community. Whenever he could, David continued to do legal work for both street-poor Mexican immigrants as well as his fellow artists and musicians. In 1990, David became chairman of the City of Austin Arts Commission.

In 1990, Rodriguez ran for District 51 state representative on a platform of crime reform, environmental preservation, insurance reform, and increased opportunities for equality in education. The Democratic party did not expect Rodriguez to perform exceptionally well at the polls due to the generally liberal nature of his politics. But he already had name recognition through his work in the arts, and this gave him an edge over his opponent, Glen Maxey. During the tail end of the campaign there was a small controversy over whether or not Rodriguez was a legal resident of the district. After a close race, Rodriguez lost in a run-off. After this defeat, David decided to sever ties with his legal practice for good and dedicate the rest of his life to music.

Discography

References

Further reading 

 Craig Clifford, "Too Weird for Kerrville: The Darker Side of Texas Music" in Craig E. Clifford and Craig Hillis (eds), 2016. Pickers and Poets: The Ruthlessly Poetic Singer-Songwriters of Texas, Texas A&M University Press.

External links

His daughter Carrie Rodriguez site
David Rodriguez exhibit in Houston Folk Music Archive (Woodson Research Center, Fondren Library, Rice University, Houston, TX, USA)
Guide to the David Rodriguez Collection (Woodson Research Center, Fondren Library, Rice University, Houston, TX, USA)

American folk singers
American country singer-songwriters
Singer-songwriters from Texas
Country musicians from Texas
Musicians from Houston
American musicians of Mexican descent
1952 births
2015 deaths